Denotified Tribes are the tribes in India that were listed originally under the Criminal Tribes Act of 1871, as Criminal Tribes and "addicted to the systematic commission of non-bailable offences." Once a tribe became "notified" as criminal, all its members were required to register with the local magistrate, failing which they would be charged with a "crime" under the Indian Penal Code.

The Criminal Tribes Act was repealed in 1949 and thus 'de-notified' the tribal communities. This Act, however, was replaced by a series of Habitual Offenders Acts, that asked police to investigate a "suspect's" "criminal tendencies" and whether their occupation is "conducive to settled way of life." The denotified tribes were reclassified as "habitual offenders" in 1959.

The name "Criminal Tribes" is itself a misnomer as no definition of tribe denotes occupation, but they were identified as tribes "performing" their primary occupation. The first census was in 1871 and at that time there was no consensus nor any definition of what constitutes a "tribe". The terms "tribe" and "caste" were used interchangeably for these tribes.

Call for repeal
The UN's anti-discrimination body Committee on the Elimination of Racial Discrimination (CERD) asked India to repeal the Habitual Offenders Act (1952) and effectively rehabilitate the denotified and nomadic tribes on 9 March 2007.

Reservations

In 2008, the National Commission for Denotified, Nomadic and Semi-Nomadic Tribes (NCDNSNT) of Ministry of Social Justice and Empowerment recommended equal reservations, as available to Scheduled Castes and Scheduled Tribes, for around 110 million people belonging to the denotified tribes, nomadic or semi-nomadic tribes in India. Along with the tribes designated as, "Nomadic" or "Semi-Nomadic", the denotified tribes are eligible for reservation.

List of Denotified tribes
Here are a list of tribes and castes which were listed under Criminal Tribes Act by British government in  India.

 Koli
 Ramoshi
 Bawaria
 Bauria
 Banjara
 Nat
 Harni
 Bhampta

See also
 National Commission for Denotified, Nomadic and Semi-Nomadic Tribes
 Nomadic tribes in India

References

Further reading
 
 
 
 
 Denotified and Nomadic Tribes in Maharashtra by Motiraj Rathod Harvard University
 Racial Abuse against Denotified and Nomadic Tribes in India Office of the United Nations High Commissioner for Human Rights
  Badge of All Their Tribes: Mahashweta Devi
 Repeal the Habitual Offenders Act and affectively rehabilitate the denotified tribes, UN to India

External links
 National Commission for denotified, Nomadic & Semi-nomadic Tribes (Govt. of India) Ministry of Social Justice and Empowerment
 List of Denotified Communities on Government of Tamil Nadu website

 
Discrimination in India
Ethnic groups in India
Law of India